Takunyapé (Tacunhape) is an extinct Tupi–Guaraní language of Brazil. They once lived southeast of the Big Bend of the Xingu River. In 1659 they and their Yudja allies defeated the Portuguese and their Kuruaya allies. The last member of the tribe died in the early 1950s while living with the Yudja on the upper Xingu.

References

Tupi–Guarani languages
Extinct languages of South America

Languages of Brazil